An alembic is an alchemical still.

Alembic may also refer to:

 Alembic (computer graphics), a computer graphics file format
 Alembic (magazine), a British poetry magazine
 Alembic, Michigan
 Alembic Inc, an American manufacturer of high-end electric basses, guitars and preamps
 Alembic Group, an Indian conglomerate
 Alembic Pharmaceuticals, a subsidiary